Year 1297 (MCCXCVII) was a common year starting on Tuesday (link will display the full calendar) of the Julian calendar.

Events 
 By place 

 Europe 
 January 8 – Guelph forces led by the Genoese leader François Grimaldi (Malizia) storm and capture the Rock of Monaco. François disguised as a Franciscan friar gains entry to the city and opens the gates for his soldiers. He seizes the castle with his stepson Rainier I; an event that is commemorated on the Monegasque coat of arms. Rainier becomes the first sovereign ruler of the House of Grimaldi in Monaco (until 1301). 
 Treaty of Alcañices: Kings Denis I (the Poet King) and the 11-year-old Ferdinand IV (the Summoned) (under the guidance of his mother, Queen-Regent Maria de Molina) sign a treaty between Portugal and Castile, which establishes an alliance of friendship and mutual defense, leading to a peace of 40 years between the two kingdoms.
 August 20 – Battle of Furnes: French forces under Robert II defeat the Flemings at Veurne. During the battle, Robert's son Philip of Artois is gravely wounded and dies a year later of his wounds.

 England 
 April 14 – King Edward I (Longshanks) makes an appeal outside Westminster Hall for support for the war against France. He apologizes for the high tax demands he has previously levied. Edward asks the Barons (some 1,500 knights) to swear allegiance to his 12-year-old son, Prince Edward of Caernarfon. Aware of the dangers of the opposition to his power, Edward appears before a large crowd and receives total loyalty.
 May – William Wallace, Scottish rebel leader, leads an uprising against the English at Lanark and kills Sheriff William Hesselrig. He joins with William Douglas the Hardy, the first Scottish nobleman in rebellion – combining forces at Sanquhar, Durisdeer and Scone Abbey (known as the Raid on Scone) in June. Later, Wallace captures the English treasury at Scone to finance the rebellion against Edward I (Longshanks).
 Summer – Edward I (Longshanks) orders a punitive expedition against the rebellious Scots.  At Roxburgh, an army of some 9,000 men (including 2,000 cavalry) led by John de Warenne is assembled. Meanwhile, William Wallace leaves the forest of Selkirk with reinforcements and turns his attention north of the Forth River.
 July – In Scotland, a group of nobles forms a confederacy (organized by Robert Wishart, bishop of Glasgow), but are defeated by English troops at Irvine. An agreement of submission to Edward I (Longshanks) is signed by the future Scottish king Robert I (the Bruce) and other Scottish leaders.
 August 22 – Edward I (Longshanks) leads an expedition to Flanders. He moves with an army (some 8,000 men) supported by 800 knights to Ghent and makes the city his base of operations in Flanders. 
 September 11 – Battle of Stirling Bridge: Scottish forces (some 6,000 men) led by Andrew Moray and William Wallace defeat an English army under John de Warenne at Stirling, on the Forth River.
 October–November – Scottish forces led by William Wallace begin raids in Northumberland and Cumberland. During a ceremony at Selkirk, Wallace is knighted and appointed Guardian of Scotland.
 Winter – Edward I (Longshanks) accepts a truce proposed by King Philip IV (the Fair) and leaves Flanders. He returns to London and prepares a campaign against William Wallace in Scotland.

 By topic 

 Religion 
 May 3 – Stefano Colonna, Italian chief magistrate and papal official, captures the treasure of the Tomb of Caecilia Metella near Rome, which is sent by the rival Caetani family to Pope Boniface VIII. 
 July 11 – Late king Louis IX (the Saint) is canonized by Boniface VIII. Louis a devout Christian of the Catholic Church, banned during his reign prostitution, gambling, blasphemy and judicial duels.
 Boniface VIII attempts to end the rivalry between Genoa and Pisa over the Tyrrhenian islands of Sardinia and Corsica, naming King James II (the Just) as regent of the islands.
 A Portuguese Water Dog is first described in a monk's report of a drowning sailor, who has been pulled from the sea by a dog.

Births 
 March 25
 Andronikos III (Palaiologos), Byzantine emperor (d. 1341)
 Arnošt of Pardubice, Czech archbishop and advisor (d. 1364)
 July 8 – Tarabya I, Burmese ruler (House of Myinsaing) (d. 1339)
 August 14 – Hanazono, Japanese emperor and poet (d. 1348)
 Abu al-Hasan Ali ibn Othman, Marinid ruler of Morocco (d. 1351)
 Bernardo Canaccio, Italian nobleman, poet and writer (d. 1360)
 Charles II (Magnanimous), French nobleman and knight (d. 1346)
 Ernest I, German nobleman and prince (House of Welf) (d. 1361)
 Ingeborg Eriksdottir, Norwegian princess and co-regent (d. 1357)
 Isabella of Sabran, Spanish noblewoman and princess (d. 1315)
 Kęstutis, Grand Duke of Lithuania (House of Gediminids) (d. 1382)
 Mary de Monthermer (or MacDuff), English noblewoman (d. 1371)
 Thomas Wake, English nobleman, governor and knight (d. 1349)
 Yanagiwara Sukeakira, Japanese nobleman (kugyō) (d. 1353)

Deaths 
 January 23 – Florent of Hainaut, Latin prince of Achaea (b. 1255)
 February 22 – Margaret of Cortona, Italian nun and saint (b. 1247)
 April 7 – Siegfried II, German nobleman and archbishop (b. 1258)
 May 21 – Judith of Habsburg, Bohemian queen consort (b. 1271)
 June 11 – Jangmok, Korean princess and queen consort (b. 1259)
 June 27 – Bérard de Goth, French cardinal, bishop and diplomat
 August 13 – Gertrude of Aldenberg, German noblewoman (b. 1227)
 August 14 – Frederick III, German nobleman and knight (b. 1220)
 August 16 – John II, Byzantine emperor of Trebizond (b. 1262)
 August 18 – Simon de Beaulieu, French nobleman and bishop
 August 19 – Louis of Toulouse, Neapolitan archbishop (b. 1274)
 August 20 – William Fraser, Scottish monk, chancellor and bishop
 September 11 – Hugh de Cressingham, English advisor and knight
 November 21 – Roger de Mowbray, English nobleman (b. 1254)
 December 28 – Hugh Aycelin, French priest and cardinal (b. 1230)
 Andrew Moray (or de Moray), Scottish nobleman and rebel leader
 Hesso of Baden, German nobleman, co-ruler and knight (b. 1268)
 Louis of Brienne, French nobleman and knight (House of Brienne)
 Muktabai (or Mukta), Indian religious leader and mystic (b. 1279)
 Nikephoros I (Komnenos Doukas), Latin ruler (despot) of Epirus 
 Radulphus de Canaberiis, French nobleman, teacher and canon
 Richard FitzJohn, English nobleman, judge, constable and knight 
 Roger de Montalt, Norman nobleman and rebel leader (b. 1265)

References